Scomberomorus is a genus of ray-finned bony fish in the mackerel family, Scombridae.  More specifically, it is a member of the tribe Scomberomorini, commonly known as the Spanish mackerels.

Species
Scomberomorus includes 18 species:
 Serra Spanish mackerel, S. brasiliensis Collette, Russo & Zavala-Camin, 1978
 King mackerel, S. cavalla (Cuvier, 1829)
 Narrow-barred Spanish mackerel, S. commerson (Lacépède, 1800)
 Monterrey Spanish mackerel, S. concolor (Lockington, 1879)
 Indo-Pacific king mackerel, S. guttatus (Bloch & Schneider, 1801)
 Korean seerfish, S. koreanus (Kishinouye, 1915)
 Streaked seerfish, S. lineolatus (Cuvier, 1829)
 Atlantic Spanish mackerel, S. maculatus (Couch, 1832)
 Papuan seerfish, S. multiradiatus Munro, 1964
 Australian spotted mackerel, S. munroi Collette & Russo, 1980
 Japanese Spanish mackerel, S. niphonius (Cuvier, 1832)
 Kanadi kingfish, S. plurilineatus Fourmanoir, 1966
 Queensland school mackerel, S. queenslandicus Munro, 1943
 Cero mackerel, S. regalis (Bloch, 1793)
 Broadbarred king mackerel, S. semifasciatus (Macleay, 1883)
 Pacific sierra, S. sierra Jordan & Starks, 1895
 Chinese seerfish, S. sinensis (Lacépède, 1800)
 West African Spanish mackerel, S. tritor (Cuvier, 1832)

As food

Scomberomorus are consumed in Taiwan and Chaoshan as Majiao Yu or Tutuo Yu, often prepared pan-fried or deep-fried and then served with soup. In Jiaodong Peninsula, they are known as Ba Yu and used as fillings in dumplings. In Japan, they are known as Sawara and often prepared grilled or as Sashimi.

References

External links

 
Scombridae
Extant Thanetian first appearances
Marine fish genera
Taxa named by Bernard Germain de Lacépède